Yash A Patnaik (born 12 March 1974) is an Indian television and film producer and screenwriter. 

He founded Indian media company Beyond Dreams Entertainment  in 2007 along with his writer wife Mamta Yash A Patnaik. 

Under the banner of Beyond Dreams Entertainment he has produced many television shows and films. Among the TV shows produced by him are Ek Veer Ki Ardaas...Veera, Sadda Haq, Kuch Rang Pyar Ke Aise Bhi,, Ishq Mein Marjawan to name a few.

Early life and career
Yash A Patnaik was born on 12 March 1974 in Bhubaneswar, Odisha, India. Patnaik did political science from Ravenshaw University and did his graduation from Symbiosis Institute of Journalism and Communications, Pune. He started his career as a journalist for print as well as electronic media and then went on to work with leading production houses and television channels. He then moved to Mumbai and worked as a journalist for quite some time before joining TV software production company Fireworks Productions. With Fireworks he worked as an executive producer for CID and Achanak 37 Saal Baad. After working with Fireworks for a period of seven years, Patnaik moved out in 2006. 

In 2007 Patnaik started his own production house Beyond Dreams Entertainment, with his wife Mamta Patnaik. Under Beyond Dreams Patnaik produced shows for almost all Hindi GEC's and also for the regional television channel Star Pravah and Pogo TV, the entertainment channel for kids. The shows produced by Patnaik under Beyond Dreams Entertainment and Inspire Films are Cambala Investigation Agency (2008), Chehra (TV series) (2009), Monica Mogre (2009), Rang Badalti Odhani (2010-2011), Jamunia (2010), Junoon – Aisi Nafrat Toh Kaisa Ishq (2012-2013), Ek Veer Ki Ardaas...Veera (2012-2015), Main Naa Bhoolungi (2014), Sadda Haq (2013-2016), Twistwala Love (2015), Million Dollar Girl (2014), Secret Diaries (2015), Kuch Rang Pyar Ke Aise Bhi (2016-present), Jaana Na Dil Se Door (2016-present)  and  Naagarjuna – Ek Yoddha (2016-2017). Patnaik has also produced regional shows like  Vachana Dile Tu Mala (2009) on Star Pravah and Neijare Megha Mote (2008) on Tarang TV .In 2017 he also produced a show Ishq Mein Marjawan whose story is developed by his wife Mamta Yash Patnaik and show airs on colors Tv and gained popularity with a small time of its release.

Patnaik produced a day horror film Kaalo, in 2010 based on centuries-old folktale about a desert witch. Kaalo is the only Indian horror film which has received Best Film in an international film festival (Best Film and Best Cinematography awards at South Africa Horrorfest 2010, Cape Town). Patnaik has worked as a screenwriter in the 2011 Indian film, Ra.One.

Filmography

Television

As a producer

Films
 Kaalo  (2010) as Producer 
 Ra.One (2011) as Screenwriter

References

External links

Living people
1974 births
Indian television producers
Businesspeople from Bhubaneswar
Film producers from Odisha